Edgar Church (November 28, 1888 – 1978) was a comics collector and artist who worked independently and eventually for the telephone company in Colorado illustrating commercial telephone book advertisements, precursors to Yellow Pages advertisements.

Church kept thousands of miscellaneous periodicals in his Colorado home to use as references for his art. From these magazines he would clip images which he would store in one of hundreds of labeled boxes. The collection of comic books that he amassed, later known as the "Edgar Church collection" or the "Mile High collection", is the most famous and valuable comic book collection known to surface in the history of comic book collecting. The collection consisted of between 18,000 and 22,000 comic books, most of them in high quality grades, and was discovered and bought in 1977 by Chuck Rozanski of Mile High Comics. About 99% of it was later sold by him to various collectors. The collection is famed for holding the highest quality copies of many Golden Age comic books, including the best known copy of Action Comics #1. (Believed to be a 9.4 to a 9.6, but the current owner refuses to get any of his books graded.)

Edgar Church was married twice and had one child with each of his wives. Church died in 1978 at age 89.

References

External links
 A selection of Edgar Church's commercial art
 A history of the Edgar Church discovery from Mile High Comics
 Several Edgar Church copies listed amongst the 10 most valuable comic books in the world

1888 births
1978 deaths
Comic book collecting